Herpestoidea is a superfamily of mammalia carnivores which includes mongooses, Malagasy carnivorans and the hyenas.

Herpestoids, with the exception of the hyenas, have a cylindrical and elongated body, which allows them to get into holes to catch prey. Herpestoids are feliforms and specialize in hunting animals bigger than they are.

They live throughout Eurasia, Africa and the island of Madagascar.

Classification
 Superfamily Herpestoidea
 Family Eupleridae (Malagasy carnivorans)
 Family Herpestidae (mongooses and allies)
 Family Hyaenidae (hyenas and aardwolf)
 Family †Lophocyonidae
 Family †Percrocutidae

Phylogenetic tree
The phylogenetic relationships of Herpestoidea are shown in the following cladogram:

References

Mammal superfamilies
Mammal taxonomy
Taxa named by Charles Lucien Bonaparte